Paso Robles Wine Services is a multi-winery processing and warehouse facility located in Paso Robles, California.

History

Founded in the fall of 2002, the Paso Robles Wine Service was started to answer a need for a facility such as the Central Coast Wine Services for winery operations in the Paso Robles area. In many ways, the Paso Robles operation duplicates the Central Coast operation, though initially it will serve AP customers, small wineries, and warehousing requirements of any size customer.

Started in a leased building, the PRWS rapidly expanded into two rented buildings and outgrew those. Starting with crush in 2006, the PRWS moved to its own facility specifically designed for winery operations.

Since its inception, the PRWS has greatly expanded its business to include well over 30 Alternating Proprietors with a waiting list, as well as some custom processed wines for vineyards.  The strength and quality of the winemaking continues to grow under the leadership of head winemaker Paul Ayers and manager David Sartain.

Facility

Area of facility:  156,000 sq. ft (14770 m2)
Stainless Steel Storage:  47,750 gallons (218 kilolitres)
Case Good Storage:  200,000 cases 
Barrel storage:  5,000+ barrels 
Press capacity:  100 tons per day 
Certified scale:   truck scale and 5,000 lbs. "bin" scale (New Facility) 
AP Facilities:  Approximately 40 individual wineries

References

Wineries in California
Companies based in San Luis Obispo County, California
Companies established in 2002
2002 establishments in California